Lindenholzhausen station is a station on the Main-Lahn Railway, which runs from Frankfurt (Main) Hauptbahnhof to Limburg (Lahn), in the Limburg an der Lahn suburb of Lindenholzhausen in the German state of Hesse.

History
The Main-Lahn Railway was opened to Lindenholzhausen in 1875 and the whole line was completed to Limburg in 1877. The initially single-track Haltepunkt (halt) of Lindenholzhausen was opened on 1 February 1875 together with the Eschhofen–Niederselters section. The duplication of the line began in 1911 and it was completed in 1913. As a result, there were two directional platform tracks in Lindenholzhausen. The Niedernhausen–Limburg section, including Lindenholzhausen station, was electrified in 1986.

Infrastructure

Platforms and tracks
Lindenholzhausen station has two platform tracks:

 track 1 on the main platform (height: 34 cm, length: 301 m), served by RB 21/RB 22 to Limburg;
 track 2 on the island platform (height: 34 cm, length: 235 m), served by RB 21 to Niedernhausen/Wiesbaden and RB 22 to Frankfurt.

The platforms are separated by a level crossing, which provides the only connection between them. Track 2 lies south of the level crossing and track 1 north of the level crossing.

Services

Rail
The following services currently call at Limburg:

Lindenholzhausen crossover on Cologne–Frankfurt high-speed railway

In addition to Lindenholzhausen station, there is a crossover (Überleitstelle) on the nearby Cologne–Frankfurt high-speed railway that is named after Lindenholzhausen. The crossover lies south of Limburg Süd station.

References

Railway stations in Hesse
Railway stations in Germany opened in 1875
Buildings and structures in Limburg-Weilburg